Aerva javanica, the kapok bush or desert cotton, is a species of plant in the family Amaranthaceae. It has a native distribution incorporating much of Africa (including Madagascar), and the south-west and south of Asia, and it has become adventitious in northern Australia.

Description

In Western Australia it tends to grow in sandy soils especially along drainage lines. It flowers between January and October. Diplospory, a type of Agamospermy, occurs during the development of female gametophyte in the ovule and hence reduction division does not take place in the Megaspore mother cell. The diploid egg is unfertilized and forms the embryo. Hence daughter plants are exactly clones of the mother.

The species uses  carbon fixation. It is dioecious, meaning male and female flowers are produced on separate individuals.

Uses
This herb is deep rooted, and is used as soil binder in desert reclamation. It is used for fuel and for fodder for goats. In traditional medicine the seeds are believed to cure headaches. A gargle is made from the plant to try to treat toothache.

The plant has naturalised in northern regions of Australia, as an alien introduction, and is cultivated and utilised by the indigenous peoples. The thick, white inflorescences have traditionally been harvested in Arabia for stuffing cushions and saddle pads. Today, the soft fibres are still used as kapok for pillows. It is called Bilhangga in the languages of the Yindjibarndi and Ngarluma people, the English term is Kapok Bush.

References

External links
Aerva javanica Flowers in Israel

javanica
Flora of Africa
Flora of Western Asia
Flora of the Indian subcontinent
Flora of the Arabian Peninsula
Herbs
Dioecious plants
Taxa named by Nicolaas Laurens Burman